Radio M.U.S.C. Man is an album by the American soul duo Womack & Womack, released in 1985. The pair were dropped by Elektra Records shortly after the release of the album.

The album peaked at No. 56 on the UK Albums Chart.

Production
The album contains a cover of George Harrison's "Here Comes the Sun". The composition of the album's sixth track, "Love's Calling", was started by the soul singer Sam Cooke (the father of Linda Womack). Many members of the Womack family contributed to the making of Radio M.U.S.C. Man.

Critical reception

Robert Christgau praised the "relaxed groove and wavering back-porch harmonies that go into their unique sound—lazy, tender, patient, long-suffering, tired of fighting." Billboard wrote that the album "showcased this couple's extraordinary writing skills and enticing vocal interplay." The Gazette called the album "brave and beautiful," writing that the duo "make the sweetest music in the whole world, propelled by effortless, hip-deep dance grooves, ballads to swoon over, and vocals—duets!—that make you wonder how this wonderful music ever went out of style." 

The Philadelphia Inquirer deemed it "excellent," praising how "Linda's smokily ethereal tenor rubs against the rough edges of Cecil's craggy baritone." The Washington Post wrote that the Womacks "[tear] apart all the conflicts, temptations, betrayals and insecurities of marriage, swapping lines, verses and songs, always espousing two clear points of view in danceable, classic soul style."

NME listed Radio M.U.S.C. Man as the 34th best album of 1985.

Track listing

Personnel
Cecil Womack - vocals
Linda Womack - vocals

References

1985 albums
Womack & Womack albums
Elektra Records albums